Boganangone is a sub-prefecture of Lobaye in the Central African Republic.

Geography 
Boganangone is located 145 km north of Mbaïki.  In 2003, the sub-prefecture has 24,322 inhabitants.

History  
The administrative post of Boganangone becomes the 5th sub-prefecture of the prefecture of Lobaye from May 2, 2002.

Administration 
Boganangone is the only commune of the sub-prefecture.

References 

Sub-prefectures of the Central African Republic
Populated places in the Central African Republic